Tevče is a small settlement on the left bank of the Vipava River south of Ajdovščina in the Littoral region of Slovenia.

References

External links 
Tevče at Geopedia

Populated places in the Municipality of Ajdovščina